The Miskin-Say Forest Reserve (also Мескинсай Meskinsay) is located in the Ala-Buka rural community, Ala-Buka District, Jalal-Abad Region, Kyrgyzstan. It was established in 1975 with a purpose of conservation of the largest spruce forest in Ala-Buka District.  The forest reserve occupies 483 hectares.

References

Protected areas established in 1975
Forest reserves of Kyrgyzstan